Trupanea glauca is a species of tephritid or fruit flies in the genus Trupanea of the family Tephritidae.

Distribution
Philippines, Java, Australia, Oceania.

References

Tephritinae
Insects described in 1869
Diptera of Asia
Diptera of Australasia